Qianjiang Evening News is a Chinese newspaper and is one of the most circulated newspapers in the world.

References

External links
Qianjiang Evening News Website

Daily newspapers published in China
Chinese-language newspapers (Simplified Chinese)
Mass media in Hangzhou